Yakchim is one of the many treatments in traditional Korean medicine treatment. It is also called pharmacopuncture, Korean herb acupuncture and acupuncture with medicinal herbs.

Definition
Traditional Korean medicine treatment of injecting herbal medicinal substances on the gyeonghyeol (經穴: Acupuncture points = the points of kyungrak  (= meridians, 經絡)) which acts as both acupuncture stimulation and direct medicinal dosage.

Background
Since herbal extracts can be absorbed directly without passing through the gastrointestinal tract, the effects of pharmacopuncture are expected to be realized more quickly than oral herbal medicine.

Menopausal symptoms
In traditional Korean medicine, many menopausal symptoms, such as hot flashes, dry mucosa, sleep disorders, and recurrent urinary tract infections, are regarded as being due to a deficiency of yin in the kidneys. The normal functions of the kidneys in Korean medicine include thermoregulation, sexuality, and water homeostasis. Kidney function may decline with increasing age, and especially during the menopause. Yin is identified with receiving and regenerative elements. The hominis placenta is believed to replenish the yin in the kidneys. Thus, the pharmacopuncture treatment for menopausal symptoms are subcutaneous injections of a human placenta extract into four acupoints (CV4, CV6, and bilateral Ex-BB1).

See also

 Dongui Bogam
 Sasang typology
 Traditional Korean medicine

References

 Ahn Sang-Woo "A reference to the original source of herb-acupuncture in methods" Journal of Korean Yakchim Association 1.1 January 1997: 87-102 http://kmbase.medric.or.kr/Main.aspx?d=KMBASE&m=VIEW&i=1138519970010010087

Bibliography

External links
kmbase.medric.or.kr (Korean)

Acupuncture
Korean culture
Traditional Korean medicine
Manual therapy